Rashmoni Das, popularly known as Rani Rashmoni, also spelled as Rani Rasmani (28 September 1793 – 19 February 1861), was an Indian  businesswoman, Zamindar, philanthropist and the founder of the Dakshineswar Kali Temple in Kolkata and remained closely associated with Sri Ramakrishna Paramhansa after she appointed him as the priest of the temple. Her other construction works include the construction of a road from Subarnarekha River to Puri for the pilgrims, Babughat (also known as Babu Rajchandra Das Ghat), Ahiritola Ghat and Nimtala ghat for the everyday bathers at the Ganges. She also offered considerable charity to the Imperial Library (now the National Library of India), the Hindu College (now Presidency University).

Presently, the Lokmata Rani Rashmoni Mission is situated at Nimpith, South 24 Parganas, West Bengal, 743338, India.

Biography

Rashmoni was born on 28 September 1793 in a peasant family of Harekrishna Das, who lived in Kona village, in present-day Halisahar, North 24 Parganas. Her mother Rampriya devi died when she was just seven years old. She was married to Babu Rajachandra Das (Marh) of Janbazar, Kolkata, a member of a wealthy Mahishya zamindar family, when she was eleven years old. They had four daughters.

After her husband's death in 1836, Rashmoni assumed responsibility of the zamindari and finances.

After inheriting property from her husband, she managed to endear herself to the people through her management skills of the estate and her many charitable works in the city. She was well loved and revered by the people and proved herself to be worthy of the title, "Rani".

The Rani had clashes with the British in India. By blocking the shipping trade on a part of the Ganges she compelled the British to abolish the tax imposed on fishing in the river, which threatened the livelihood of fishermen. When Puja processions were stopped by the British on the charge that they disturbed the peace, she defied the orders.  The British withdrew the penalty imposed on her.

She tacitly supported social activist/scholar Ishwar Chandra Vidyasagar's campaign for widow remarriage. She even submitted a draft bill against polygamy to the East India Company, who handled the administration during those days.

The Eden Gardens (then Marh Bagan) was also a part of their Zamindari area, which they later gifted to the Eden sisters of Lord Auckland, the then Governor-General of India, as they helped him in saving life of Babu's 3rd daughter from a fatal disease.

The Rani also had to her credit numerous charitable works and other contributions to society. She oversaw the construction of a road from Subarnarekha river to Puri for pilgrims. She funded the construction of ghats such as Babughat (in memory of her husband), Ahiritola Ghat and Nimtala Ghat for the daily bathers in the Ganges. Rashmoni also donated to the then Imperial Library (now the National Library of India) and Hindu College (now Presidency University). Prince Dwarkanath Tagore had mortgaged a part of his Zamindari in now South 24 Parganas (part of present-day Santoshpur and adjoining areas) to Rashmoni for his passage to England. This part of land which was then a part of the Sunderbans was marshy and almost uninhabitable except for some families of thugs who found the area convenient to stay and venture out for plunders in far away places mounted on stilts. Rashmoni persuaded these families and helped them to build up fisheries in the surrounding water bodies that later turned into large, rich bheris. They gradually gave up their profession of plundering and transformed into a community of fishermen. 

Profoundly affected by a dream to built a temple of Goddess Kali, Rani looked for and purchased a 30,000-acre plot in the village of Dakhineswar. The large temple complex was built between 1847 and 1855. The  plot was bought from an Englishman, Jake Hastie, and was then popularly known as Saheban Bagicha.  It took eight years and nine hundred thousand rupees to complete the construction. The idol of Goddess Kali was installed on the Snana Yatra day on 31 May 1855 amid festivities at the temple formerly known as Sri Sri Jagadishwari Kali, with Ramkumar Chhattopadhyay as the head priest. Soon his younger brother Gadai or Gadadhar (later known as Ramakrishna) moved in and so did his nephew Hriday to assist him.  

Rani Rashmoni's House at Janbazar was venue of traditional Durga Puja celebration each autumn. This included traditional pomp, including all-night jatras (folk theatre), rather than by entertainment for the Englishmen with whom she carried on a running feud. After her death in 1861, her sons-in-law took to celebrating Durga Puja in their respective premises.

Being an ardent devotee of the Goddess Kali, "Sri Rasmani Dasi, longing for the Feet of Kali ” were the words engraved in the official seal of her estate.

In popular culture

Rani Rashmoni has also been subject of a biographical film in Bengali language, titled Rani Rasmani (film) (1955), directed by Kaliprasad Ghosh, and wherein lead played by famous theatre personality and actress Molina Devi.

Zee Bangla also featured a daily soap depicting the life of the illustrious Rani, Karunamoyee Rani Rashmoni, which premiered on 24 July 2017 and was telecasted daily till 13 February 2022.

Monuments
An avenue in Esplanade, Kolkata is named after her as Rani Rashmoni Avenue, where her statue is also located.
A road is named after her as Rani Rashmoni Road near her ancestral house at Janbazar, Kolkata.
A road is named after her as Rani Rashmoni Road at Dakshineshwar.
The Department of Post of Government of India issued a postage stamp to memorialize the bicentennial of Rani Rashmoni in 1993
A Ferry Ghat known as Rani Rashmoni Ghat has been built for ferry services in Barrackpore, West Bengal and in Hooghly, West Bengal (just after the Hooghly District Correctional Home)
One of the 5 Fast Patrol Vessels of Indian Coast Guard has been named after Rani Rashmoni. It was commissioned in June 2018 and will be based in Visakhapatnam (indigenously built by Hindustan Shipyard).

See also
Rani Rashmoni Green University

Further reading
 Sri Sri Ramakrishna Kathamrita Chapter 3 – The Kali Temple

References

External links

 Great Indian –  Rani Rashmoni

1793 births
1861 deaths
Indian women philanthropists
Indian philanthropists
Shaktas
Ramakrishna
Founders of Indian schools and colleges
Bengali zamindars
18th-century Indian women
19th-century Indian businesspeople
Indian social reformers
Social workers from West Bengal
Women educators from West Bengal
Indian educators
19th-century Indian educators
Indian social workers